The Springfield Kings were an American ice hockey team in Springfield, Illinois. They played in the Continental Hockey League (CnHL) from 1976 to 1985. The team played at the Ice Chateau.

The team was the runner-up in the league for the 1982–83 season losing to the Troy Sabres (4-2) in the finals. The head coach for the 1983–84 season was Pete Crawford. Ron Dorgan coached the team during the 1984–85 season.

Season-by-season record

References

Ice hockey teams in Illinois
Kings
Ice hockey clubs established in 1976
Sports clubs disestablished in 1985
1976 establishments in Illinois
1985 disestablishments in Illinois